Imre Pulai (born November 14, 1967 in Budapest) is a Hungarian sprint canoeist, who won two Olympic medals in the Canadian canoeing event, including a gold medal at the 2000 Summer Olympics with teammate Ferenc Novák.

As a twenty-year-old, Pulai reached the C-1 1000 m final at the 1988 Summer Olympics in Seoul, finishing in sixth place. However, it was not until five years later that he won the first of his four world championship gold medals - in the C-4 1000 m in Copenhagen. In 1994, he retained that title and a year later, he was individual world champion, ending Ivans Klementjevs's run of five straight victories in Duisburg. That achievement earned him the title of 1995 Hungarian Sportsman of the Year. At the 1996 Summer Olympics in Atlanta, he won the C-1 500 m bronze medal.

After Atlanta, his career took another dip until he teamed up with Ferenc Novák in the C-2. In 1999, their first season together, the pair were world silver medalists and went on to win the C-2 500 m gold medal at the 2000 Summer Olympics in Sydney. When the two were paired up, they became known as "The Monster and the Little Guy" because of the size differential between them (Pulai was 6' 6.5" (1.99 m) and weighed 214 lb (97 kg) while Novák was 5' 8" (1.72 m) and weighed 170 lb (77 kg).).

In 2003 Pulai won his fourth world championship gold in the C-4 1000 m at Gainesville, Georgia, United States and he won also his second bronze medal in the C-4 500 m event. Most assumed that would be the final medal of his long career, but in 2006 he made a comeback at the 2006 European Championships, held in Račice, Czech Republic, winning a C-4 500 m bronze medal. At the age of thirty-eight he was the second-oldest male competitor.

Pulai is nicknamed "Sumák".

In February 2008, Pulai met with the International Luge Federation in Berlin to help promote luge in his native Hungary which Pulai started competing in 2005. At the FIL European Luge Championships 2010 in Sigulda, he finished 34th in the men's singles event.

Awards

 Hungarian canoer of the Year (1): 1994
 Hungarian Sportman of the Year (1) - votes of sports journalists: 1995

Orders and special awards
   Cross of Merit of the Republic of Hungary – Silver Cross (1996)
   Order of Merit of the Republic of Hungary – Officer's Cross (2000)

References

 Olympic champion in canoeing Imre Pulai tries luge. at the Fédération Internationale de Luge de Course (19 February 2008 article accessed 8 December 2009.)
 
 
 Kataca.hu Profile 
 
 Wallechinsky, David and Jaime Loucky (2008). "Canoeing: Men's Canadian Pairs 500 Meters". In The Complete Book of the Olympics: 2008 Edition. London: Aurum Press Limited. p. 482.

External links
 

1967 births
Canoeists at the 1988 Summer Olympics
Canoeists at the 1992 Summer Olympics
Canoeists at the 1996 Summer Olympics
Canoeists at the 2000 Summer Olympics
Hungarian male canoeists
Hungarian male lugers
ICF Canoe Sprint World Championships medalists in Canadian
Living people
Medalists at the 1996 Summer Olympics
Medalists at the 2000 Summer Olympics
Olympic bronze medalists for Hungary
Olympic canoeists of Hungary
Olympic gold medalists for Hungary
Olympic medalists in canoeing
Canoeists from Budapest
20th-century Hungarian people